Ichneumon is a genus of parasitic wasps in the family Ichneumonidae.

Selected species
This genus includes about 270 species:
Ichneumon eumerus Wesmael, 1857
Ichneumon extensorius Linnaeus, 1758
Ichneumon insidiosus Wesmael, 1844
Ichneumon nyassae Heinrich, 1967
Ichneumon rubriornatus Cameron, 1904
Ichneumon sarcitorius Linnaeus, 1758
Ichneumon tottor Thunberg, 1822
Ichneumon unicinctus Brullé, 1846

Cultural significance 
In the eighteenth century Ichneumon was regarded as an instance of the God-given balance in nature; in the nineteenth the possibility of using it as a form of biocontrol was briefly entertained. It was used as the symbol of the reformed Entomological Society of London in 1833.

References

 Biolib
 Waspweb

Ichneumonidae genera
Ichneumoninae